Szczeberka is a river of Poland, a tributary of the river Blizna north of Augustów.

Rivers of Poland
Rivers of Podlaskie Voivodeship